William Mervyn Shepherd  (born ) was the chairman of the Northland Regional Council in New Zealand from 2013 to 2019.

His constituency was Coastal North. In the 2019 local elections, he failed to be re-elected.

As of 2022, he is campaign chair for Shane Reti.

References

External links
Your Councilors

1940s births
Living people
Northland regional councillors
Recipients of the Queen's Service Medal
Year of birth missing (living people)